The Intercollegiate Hockey Association was a loose collection of ice hockey programs from schools in the Northeastern United States. The colleges involved would schedule one another at least once during the season with and the team with the best record would be declared the champion. As this was the only championship for college hockey at the time, however unofficial the designation may have been, the victor served as the de facto 
National Champion. The IHA was called both the Intercollegiate Hockey Association and the Intercollegiate Hockey League during its existence. It's referred to here as the IHA to distinguish from the later Intercollegiate Hockey League. Although all of the IHA member colleges would later become members of the Ivy League, all of the Ivy League colleges were never members of the IHA at the same time.

History
The league began in February 1898 while the season was in progress. Brown, Columbia and Yale agreed to form the league after some of their intercollegiate game had already been played but counted all of the matches played that season for the inaugural championship. Brown was the initial victor, finishing with an undefeated record between the three squads.

After the first full season of play the league started holding a championship series at the end of the season for the two best teams. Yale won the first three series. The series was eventually reduced to a single game before being abandoned altogether after 1904. Beginning with the 1904–05 season the league champion would simple be the team with the best record against conference opponents.

The league expanded to include other future Ivy League schools like Harvard and Princeton then welcomed Dartmouth after Brown suspended its program in 1906. At the same meeting where Dartmouth was admitted the committee also decided to disallow freshmen from participating on varsity squads. Cornell joined the league a few years later and everything appeared to be going well for the league.

In 1911 restrictions imposed by the Harvard faculty forced the college to resign from the league. The following year both Columbia and Yale left for various reasons, dropping membership back to just three teams. The league continued until the end of the year before disbanding.

Members

† Dartmouth's athletic teams did not possess a moniker until the 1920s.

Membership timeline

See also
 Intercollegiate Hockey League
 Pentagonal League

References

Defunct NCAA Division I ice hockey conferences
Sports in the Eastern United States